The Stony Brook Covered Bridge, also called the Moseley Covered Bridge, is a wooden covered bridge that crosses Stony Brook in Northfield, Vermont on Stony Brook Road.  Built in 1899, it is one of two surviving 19th-century King post truss bridges in the state.  It was listed on the National Register of Historic Places in 1974.

Description and history
The Stony Brook Covered Bridge stands in a rural area of southern Northfield, carrying Stony Brook Road across the eponymous brook in a roughly northwest-southeast orientation. It is covered by a gabled roof, and its exterior is clad in vertical board siding, which extends a short way inside each portal. The siding does not extend all the way to the roof, providing an open strip between the two. The bridge rests on stone abutments that have been faced in concrete, and has a deck of wooden planks.

The bridge was built in 1899, and is believed to be the last King post truss bridge to be built in the historic period of covered bridge construction in the state.  It is one of only two historic bridges of this design left standing in the state, the other being the Pine Brook Covered Bridge.  It is also one of five covered bridges in Northfield, representing one of the highest concentrations of covered bridges in the state. In 1971 the bridge deck was strengthened by the addition of 5 steel I beams underneath.  In 1990 the original granite abutments were faced with concrete.

See also
 
 
 
 
 List of covered bridges in Vermont
 National Register of Historic Places listings in Washington County, Vermont
 List of bridges on the National Register of Historic Places in Vermont

References

Buildings and structures in Northfield, Vermont
Bridges completed in 1899
Covered bridges on the National Register of Historic Places in Vermont
King post truss bridges in the United States
Wooden bridges in Vermont
Covered bridges in Washington County, Vermont
1899 establishments in Vermont
National Register of Historic Places in Washington County, Vermont
Road bridges on the National Register of Historic Places in Vermont